Stefan Zoev (born 19 January 1943) is a Bulgarian gymnast. He competed at the 1968 Summer Olympics and the 1972 Summer Olympics.

References

1943 births
Living people
Bulgarian male artistic gymnasts
Olympic gymnasts of Bulgaria
Gymnasts at the 1968 Summer Olympics
Gymnasts at the 1972 Summer Olympics
Gymnasts from Sofia